Frederick Munroe Bourne (June 26, 1910 – July 11, 1992) was a Canadian swimmer who competed at the 1928, 1932 and 1936 Olympics in the 100-metre freestyle, 100-metre backstroke and 4×200-metre freestyle relay events and won a bronze medal in the relay in 1928.  He was eliminated in the preliminary rounds of all his individual events.  Bourne won the 100-yard and 4×200-yard freestyle competitions at the 1930 British Empire Games.

Bourne trained in track and field athletics and water polo before focusing on swimming.  In 1927 he entered McGill University in Montreal, and graduated in 1931 with degrees in English and political science.  In 1932 he won a Rhodes Scholarship to study at Oxford University.  He returned to McGill in 1935 to study for a medical degree, which he received in 1937. During World War II, Bourne served in the Canadian Army and was honourably discharged with the rank of major.  Afterward he worked as a doctor and was inducted into the McGill Athletics Hall of Fame in 1996.

See also
 List of Commonwealth Games medallists in swimming (men)
 List of Olympic medalists in swimming (men)

References
 sports-reference

1910 births
1992 deaths
Canadian male backstroke swimmers
Canadian male freestyle swimmers
Commonwealth Games gold medallists for Canada
McGill University alumni
Medalists at the 1928 Summer Olympics
Olympic bronze medalists for Canada
Olympic bronze medalists in swimming
Olympic swimmers of Canada
Swimmers from Victoria, British Columbia
Swimmers at the 1928 Summer Olympics
Swimmers at the 1930 British Empire Games
Swimmers at the 1932 Summer Olympics
Swimmers at the 1936 Summer Olympics
Commonwealth Games medallists in swimming
Canadian military personnel of World War II
20th-century Canadian people
Medallists at the 1930 British Empire Games